Spokoyevka is a rural locality (a khutor) in Vysoksky Selsoviet Rural Settlement, Medvensky District, Kursk Oblast, Russia. Population:

Geography 
The khutor is located 64 km from the Russia–Ukraine border, 26 km south-west of Kursk, 12 km north-west of the district center – the urban-type settlement Medvenka, 8 km from the selsoviet center – Vysokoye.

 Climate
Spokoyevka has a warm-summer humid continental climate (Dfb in the Köppen climate classification).

Transport 
Spokoyevka is located 5.5 km from the federal route  Crimea Highway (a part of the European route ), 10.5 km from the road of regional importance  (Dyakonovo – Sudzha – border with Ukraine), 3 km from the road  (M2 Crimea Highway – 38K-004), 16 km from the nearest railway station Dyakonovo (railway line Lgov I — Kursk).

The rural locality is situated 35 km from Kursk Vostochny Airport, 103 km from Belgorod International Airport and 228 km from Voronezh Peter the Great Airport.

References

Notes

Sources

Rural localities in Medvensky District